NGC 7301 is a barred spiral galaxy located around  away from Earth in the constellation Aquarius. It was discovered by American astronomer Francis Preserved Leavenworth In 1886.

See also
 NGC 1300
 List of NGC objects (7001–7840)
 NGC 4921  
 Milky Way

References

External links

Astronomical objects discovered in 1886
Barred spiral galaxies
Aquarius (constellation)
7301
69021